Floride may refer to:

Floride is the French name for Florida and may be used in Francophone references to the state:
 Floride (film)
 Renault Floride, a sports car
 French Florida

Other uses:
 An uncommon female given name – see e.g. Floride Calhoun
 A misspelling for "fluoride"
 A typeface by Deberny & Peignot

See also 
 
 Florid (disambiguation)
 Florida (disambiguation)